New Hampshire Route 136 (abbreviated NH 136) is a  east–west state highway in Hillsborough County in southern New Hampshire. The road connects New Boston and Peterborough.

The eastern terminus of NH 136 is at New Hampshire Route 13 in New Boston. The western terminus is in Peterborough at U.S. Route 202 and New Hampshire Route 123.

Major intersections

References

External links

 New Hampshire State Route 136 on Flickr

136
Transportation in Hillsborough County, New Hampshire